The Advanced Stream Redirector (ASX) format is a type of XML metafile designed to store a playlist of Windows Media files for a multimedia presentation.

It is used frequently on streaming video servers where multiple ASF files are to be played in succession. Both RTSP and MMS streaming protocols are supported, as well as HTTP.

ASX files have MIME type video/x-ms-asf (as do ASF files).

Example
<asx version="3.0">
  <title>Example.com Live Stream</title>
 
  <entry>
    <title>Short Announcement to Play Before Main Stream</title>
    <ref href="http://example.com/announcement.wma" />
    <param name="aParameterName" value="aParameterValue" />
  </entry>
   
  <entry>
    <title>Example radio</title>
    <ref href="http://example.com:8080" />
    <author>Example.com</author>
    <copyright>Copyright © 2005 Example.com</copyright>
  </entry>
</asx>

Windows Media Player playlists

ASX can be used to print playlists done with Windows Media Player. To print a playlist, there are two main steps for those people that are familiar with Windows command lines and XSLT:
 Install an XSLT processor 
 Export the playlist from the Windows Media Player with: Menu File -> Save current playlist

See also

 Other playlist file formats
 M3U - The most common playlist format
 PLS - SHOUTcast
 XSPF - Xiph.Org Foundation
 WPL - Windows Media Player

References

External links
 MS Docs Simple ASX, 2020
 MS Docs ASX Elements Reference, 2020
 MS Docs Adding Windows Media to Web Pages (For Webmasters), 2020
 Creating Customized Web Experiences with Windows Media Player 9 Series
 A survey of playlist formats, 2003
 http://edutechwiki.unige.ch/en/Advanced_Stream_Redirector

Microsoft Windows multimedia technology
Playlist file formats
Film and video technology
Playlist markup languages